Diaspidiotus is a genus of true bugs belonging to the family Diaspididae.

The genus has cosmopolitan distribution.

Species:
 Diaspidiotus acutus (Borchsenius, 1964)
 Diaspidiotus aesculi (Johnson, 1896)

References

Diaspididae